Nanu Khurd is a mid-sized Yadav dominated village located in the district of Gurgaon in the state of Haryana in India. Khurd and Kalan Persian language word which means small and Big respectively when two villages have same name then it is distinguished as Kalan means Big and Khurd means Small with Village Name.

Population
It has a population of about 1109 persons living in around 189 households.

References 

Villages in Gurgaon district